Uhtred was the King of Hwicce, jointly with Eanberht and Ealdred.

In 757 Eanberht, Uhtred, and Ealdred, granted land to Bishop Milred, and in 759 to Abbot Headda. In 770 Uhtred issued a charter to his thegn Æthelmund. Another grant, to Coelmund, is dated 756, apparently in error for 777, 778, or 779.

References

External links
 

Year of birth missing
Year of death missing
Hwiccan monarchs
8th-century English monarchs